The 2007 Estonian Figure Skating Championships were held at the Premia Jäähall in Tallinn on 5–7 January 2007. Skaters competed in the disciplines of men's singles, ladies' singles, pair skating, and ice dancing on the senior and junior levels.

The senior compulsory dance was the Golden Waltz and the junior compulsory dance was the Midnight Blues.

Senior results

Ladies

Pairs

Ice dancing

Junior results

Men

Ladies

Ice dancing

External links
 2007 Estonian Championships results

Figure Skating Championships
Estonian Figure Skating Championships, 2007
Estonian Figure Skating Championships